Adnan Ćatić (born 31 January 1979), known as Felix Sturm, is a Bosnian-German professional boxer. He has held multiple world championships in two weight classes, including the WBO middleweight title from 2003 to 2004, the WBA middleweight title twice between 2006 and 2012, the IBF middleweight title from 2013 to 2014, and the WBA (Super) super-middleweight title in 2016. As an amateur, Sturm won a gold medal at the 2000 European Championships in the light-middleweight division.

Amateur highlights 
1997 2nd place at Light Middleweight in German National Championships, losing to Jürgen Brähmer on points
1998 German National Light Middleweight champion, defeating Jorg Rosomkiewicz
1999 competed at the World Championships in Houston, United States; as a Light Middleweight. Results were:
Defeated Andrei Tsurkan (Ukraine) points
Lost to Yermakhan Ibraimov (Kazakhstan) points
1999 German National Light Middleweight champion, defeating Jorg Rosomkiewicz
2000 1st place at Light Middleweight at European Championships in Tampere, Finland. Results were:
Defeated Karoly Balzsay (Hungary) points
Defeated Miroslaw Nowosada (Poland) points
Defeated Dmitri Usagin (Bulgaria) points
Defeated Andrei Mishin (Russia) 3-1
Represented Germany at the 2000 Olympic Games in Sydney, Australia. Results were:
Defeated Dilshod Yarbekov (Uzbekistan) points
Defeated Richard Rowles (Australia) TKO 3
Lost to Jermain Taylor (United States) points

He finished his amateur career with a record of 143 wins and 10 losses.

Professional career

Early years 
On 27 January 2001, Sturm made his debut as a professional boxer facing Antonio Ribeiro from Angola. Six months earlier he had qualified for the Olympic Games in Sydney, but lost his fight to future middleweight champ Jermain Taylor.

After 16 successful matches, Sturm won the WBO Inter-Continental middleweight title on 10 May 2003. On 13 September 2003, he replaced the injured Bert Schenk in a WBO title bout against Argentinian Hectór Javier Velazco and won the match. Sturm defended the title against Rubén Varón Fernández from Spain.

Sturm vs. De La Hoya 

On 5 June 2004 in Las Vegas, Sturm faced Oscar De La Hoya in a defense of his WBO middleweight championship. All three judges scored the fight 115-113 for De La Hoya, while Harold Lederman scored the fight 115-113 for Sturm. Compubox counted Sturm as landing 234 of 541 punches, while counting De La Hoya as landing 188 of 792. Sturm protested the decision with the Nevada Athletic Commission to no avail.

WBA champion 
On 11 March 2006, Sturm defeated Maselino Masoe for the WBA middleweight title by a unanimous decision. Sturm then lost his title against former champion Javier Castillejo via TKO on 15 July 2006 but won it back from Castillejo in a rematch on 28 April 2007 by a twelve round unanimous decision in Oberhausen, which he earned after defeating Gavin Topp by TKO in the sixth round.

Sturm became a three-time world champion after defeating Castillejo in the rematch.

He also fought Randy Griffin twice, drawing with him in their first fight and winning their second fight by unanimous decision.

On 2 November 2008, Sturm retained his WBA middleweight title via unanimous decision (118-110, 118-110 and 119-109) over Sebastian Sylvester. He improved to 31-2, with one draw, while Sylvester fell to 31-3.

On 11 July 2009, he defended his title against Khoren Gevor in Nürburg in 12 rounds.

After over a year of inactivity Sturm came back to defend his WBA title against Giovanni Lorenzo, with the winner becoming the WBA "Super" champion. Sturm defeated Lorenzo by a twelve round unanimous decision with the judges giving a comfortable 117-111 twice and 118-111 on the scorecards.

After defeating top contenders Matthew Macklin and Sebastian Zbik, Sturm lost his WBA title to Australian Daniel Geale. Geale's IBF title was also on the line.

IBF champion 
In 2013, Sturm became Germany's first four-time world champion by defeating Darren Barker in Stuttgart. Barker was in no condition to continue after suffering a serious hip injury. Barker's IBF title was on the line. One month later the Englishman announced his retirement from boxing.

In mid-2014, Sturm lost his title against Sam Soliman via unanimous decision. Soliman won by official scores of 110-118 (twice) and 111–117.

Super-middleweight

WBA (Super) champion 
In 2016, Sturm defeated Fedor Chudinov by way decision, becoming a two-weight world champion. Later after the fight, the doping samples that were taken from Sturm before the fight were suddenly challenged,  however, the sample documents were not complete, as the location, time of arrival was not documented. Due to this inaccuracy, Sturm was not stripped of his titles. He then relocated to Bosnia and Herzegovina.

Doping allegations 
Sturm broke the silence two months later with a post which he shared via Instagram where he complained about being treated unfairly by the doping investigators. Sturm wrote that he was only informed two months after the first doping sample about the results and that he wasn't told why it took longer than usual (two weeks). After engaging a lawyer who requested all the required documents from the investigators he noticed that the last page was missing, "...where is written, when my sample arrived at the laboratory, who received it and who analysed the sample.", it was written in that social media post. He allegedly didn't get an answer after submitting further inquiries and was denied the right to let the b-sample be analysed by another laboratory. Sturm claimed that the WBA refrained from suspending him because of these irregularities.

Comeback 
On 19 December 2020, Sturm had his first fight since February 2016. Sturm dominated opponent Timo Rost throughout the fight and earned a unanimous decision victory, winning wide on all three scorecards. Two of the judges scored the fight 100-90 and one judge scored it 99-91.

Personal life 
Sturm was born Adnan Ćatić in Leverkusen, Germany. His parents, Ćamil and Zahida, are ethnic Bosniaks who hail from Blagaj, Bosnia and Herzegovina, having emigrated to Germany in the 1970s. For marketing reasons, Ćatić started as a professional boxer under the stage name Felix Sturm. In addition to German citizenship, he also has Bosnian citizenship.

In May 2020, Sturm was jailed for tax evasion

Professional boxing record

Television viewership

Germany

US pay-per-view bouts

References

External links 

Adnan Catic (Felix Sturm) profile at leverkusen.com 
Felix Sturm – Profile, News Archive & Current Rankings at Box.Live

1979 births
World Boxing Association champions
World Boxing Organization champions
International Boxing Federation champions
German people of Bosnia and Herzegovina descent
German sportspeople in doping cases
Doping cases in boxing
Sportspeople from Leverkusen
Olympic boxers of Germany
Boxers at the 2000 Summer Olympics
Living people
German male boxers
Bosnia and Herzegovina male boxers
Light-middleweight boxers
World middleweight boxing champions
World super-middleweight boxing champions